The Central African CFA franc (French: franc CFA or simply franc; ISO code: XAF; abbreviation: F.CFA) is the currency of six independent states in Central Africa: Cameroon, Central African Republic, Chad, Republic of the Congo, Equatorial Guinea and Gabon. These six countries have a combined population of 55.2 million people (as of 2020), and a combined GDP of US$113.322 billion (as of 2020).

CFA stands for Coopération financière en Afrique centrale ("Financial Cooperation in Central Africa"). It is issued by the Bank of Central African States (BEAC; Banque des États de l'Afrique Centrale), located in Yaoundé, Cameroon, for the members of the Economic and Monetary Community of Central Africa (CEMAC; Communauté Économique et Monétaire de l'Afrique Centrale). The franc is nominally subdivided into 100 centimes but no centime denominations have been issued.

In several west African states, the West African CFA franc, which is of equal value to the Central African CFA franc, is in circulation.

History

The CFA franc was introduced to the French colonies in Equatorial Africa in 1945, replacing the French Equatorial African franc. The Equatorial African colonies and territories using the CFA franc were Chad, French Cameroun, French Congo, Gabon and Ubangi-Shari.

The currency remained in use when these colonies gained their independence. Equatorial Guinea, the only former Spanish colony in the zone, adopted the CFA franc in 1984, replacing the Equatorial Guinean ekwele at a rate of 1 franc = 4 bipkwele.

The currency was pegged to the French franc (F) at F.CFA 1 = 2 French francs from 1948, becoming F.CFA 1 = NF 0.02 after introduction of the new franc at 1 new franc = 100 old francs. In 1994 the currency was devalued by half to F.CFA 1 = F 0.01. From 1999 it has since been pegged to the euro at €1 = F 6.55957 = F.CFA 655.957.

Criticism
According to the BBC, "critics, such as those leading the anti-CFA movement, say true economic development for the 14 African countries can only be achieved if they get rid of the currency. They argue that in exchange for the guarantees provided by the French treasury, African countries channel more money to France than they receive in aid. They also argue that they have no say in deciding key monetary policies agreed to by European countries, which are members of the Eurozone."

Coins
In 1948, coins were issued for use in all the colonies (not including French Cameroun) in denominations of 1 and 2 francs. This was the last issue of a 2 franc coin for nearly 50 years. In 1958, 5, 10, and 25 franc coins were added, which were also used in French Cameroun. These bore the name Cameroun in addition to États de l'Afrique Equatoriale. In 1961, nickel 50 franc coins were introduced, followed by nickel 100 franc pieces in 1966.

From 1971, the 100 franc coins were issued for each of the individual member states, depicting the state name in which they were issued. 50 franc coins were also issued in this manner between 1976 and 1996, after being reduced in size. However instead of depicting the state name each was given an identification letter on the top reverse. 50 franc coins with the letter "A" were issued for Chad, "B" for Central African Republic, "C" for Congo, "D" for Gabon, and "E" for Cameroon.  In 1976, cupro-nickel 500 franc coins were introduced. From 1985, these were also issued by the individual states. That year also saw the introduction of 5, 25, 50 and 100 franc coins for use in Equatorial Guinea, which had recently joined the monetary union, depicting all titles and information in Spanish instead of the usual French, most notably the denomination as "franco" instead of "franc". Despite titular differences in some of the coinage, all were legal and exchangeable tender in all member nations.

In 1996, centralized production of the 100 franc coin was resumed, with a single 500 franc coin reintroduced in 1998. Despite dropping state names and code letters, the overall design of the coins remained relatively unchanged.

2006 saw a redesign of all denominations of coins for the CFA franc, along with the introduction of a 2 franc piece. The 1, 5, 10, and 25 franc coins were reduced in size, while a new bi-metallic 100 franc coin was introduced, along with a new and reduced size 500 franc coin with heightened security features, including laser marking. All newer coins depict the acronym "CEMAC" for "Communauté Économique et Monétaire de l'Afrique Centrale". Older sized coins continue to remain legal tender alongside the newly configured coins.

All CFA coins depict both a mint mark, along with an engraver's privy mark. The mint mark is located on the reverse on the left side of the denomination while the engraver's mark is located on the right.

Banknotes
When the CFA franc was introduced, notes issued by the Caisse Centrale de la France d'Outre-Mer ("Central Cashier of Overseas France") in denominations of 5, 10, 20, 100, and 1,000 francs were in circulation. In 1947, a new series of notes was introduced for use in French Equatorial Africa, although the notes did not bear the name of the colonies. Notes were issued in denominations of 5, 10, 20, 50, 100, and 1,000 francs, followed by those of 500 francs in 1949, and 5,000 francs in 1952. In 1957, the Institut d'Émission de l'Afrique Équatoriale Française et du Cameroun took over paper money production, issuing all of the earlier denominations except for the 500 -franc bill.

In 1961, the Banque Centrale des États de l'Afrique Équatoriale et du Cameroun took over banknote production, with notes below 100 francs ceasing to be issued. The name of the bank changed to Banque Centrale des États de l'Afrique Équatoriale in 1963. 10,000 franc notes were introduced in 1968, whilst the 10 franc notes were replaced by coins in 1971.

In 1975, the bank name changed again to the Banque des États de l'Afrique Centrale and the individual states began issuing notes in their own names, in denominations of 500, 1,000, 5,000 and 10,000 francs. This practice ended in 1993. Since then, the banknotes have been issued with only a letter prominently displayed to distinguish between the issues of the different states. 2,000 franc notes were introduced in 1993. The country letter codes are as follows:

1993 series:

C – 
E – 
F – 
L – 
N – 
P – 

2002 series:

A – 
C – 
F – 
M – 
T – 
U –

See also
African Central Bank 
African and Malagasy Union (AMU) 
Council of Arab Economic Unity (CAEU)
Economic Community of West African States 
French Equatorial African franc
West African CFA franc

General:
Monetary union
Economy of Cameroon
Economy of the Central African Republic
Economy of Chad
Economy of the Republic of the Congo
Economy of Equatorial Guinea
Economy of Gabon

References

External links

   (Official Site of the Economic and Monetary Community of Central Africa)
 Central African CFA franc Banknotes

|-

|-

|-

|-

|-

Currency unions
Fixed exchange rate
Currencies introduced in 1945
Currencies of Cameroon